The Bay of Fundy is a bay between the Canadian provinces of New Brunswick and Nova Scotia, with a small portion touching the U.S. state of Maine. It is an arm of the Gulf of Maine. Its extremely high tidal range is the highest in the world. The name is likely a corruption of the French word , meaning 'split'.

Hydrology

Tides 
Some tides are higher than others, depending on the position of the moon, the sun, and atmospheric conditions. Tides are semidiurnal, meaning they have two highs and two lows each day, with about six hours and 13 minutes between each high and low tide.

Because of tidal resonance in the funnel-shaped bay, the tides that flow through the channel are very powerful. In one 12-hour tidal cycle, about 100 billion tons (110 billion short tons) of water flows in and out of the bay, which is twice as much as the combined total flow of all the rivers of the world over the same period. The Annapolis Royal Generating Station, a 20 MW tidal power station on the Annapolis River upstream of Annapolis Royal, was one of the few tidal generating stations in the world, and the only one in North America.

Most of the rivers have a tidal bore, a wave front of the incoming tide that "bores" its way up a river against its normal flow. Notable ones include those on the Petticodiac, Maccan, St. Croix, and Kennetcook rivers. Since the opening of the causeway gates in 2010, the bore has been coming back, and in 2013 surfers rode it a record-breaking .

Other phenomena include the Reversing Falls near the mouth of the Saint John River, a rip tide at Cape Enrage, and the Old Sow whirlpool at Passamaquoddy Bay.

Geology
The story of the Fundy Basin begins about 200 million years ago in the early Jurassic, when all land on earth was part of a supercontinent called Pangaea. At that time what is now the Maritimes was situated near the equator and had a warm tropical climate and lush vegetation. As continental drift reshaped the world, rift valleys formed, including the Cobequid–Chedabucto fault system. 

During the continental breakup, magma erupted as basaltic lavas and left igneous rock formations such as the columnar jointing which can be seen on Brier and Grand Manan islands, among other places around the bay. These flows often are the sites of rarer mineral deposits including agate, amethyst, and stilbite, the latter being the provincial mineral of Nova Scotia.

These rifts filled with sediment which became sedimentary rock. Many fossils have been found along the Fundy shoreline. The oldest dinosaur fossil in Canada was found at Burntcoat Head. Very early reptiles have been discovered in Carboniferous tree trunks at Joggins. Wasson Bluff has a rich trove of Jurassic fossils.

The bay is a member of the Global Geoparks Network, a UNESCO initiative to promote and conserve the planet's geological heritage.

Flora and fauna

Although some land areas are protected, there is no formal marine protection zone in the bay. The Conservation Council of New Brunswick works to protect the ecosystem of the bay. A result of shipping traffic has been the potential for increased collisions between ships and the critically endangered North Atlantic right whale. In 2003, the Canadian Coast Guard adjusted shipping lanes crossing prime whale feeding areas at the entrance to the Bay of Fundy to lessen the risk of collision. Many other marine mammals are found in the bay including fin whales, humpback whales, minke whales, Atlantic white-sided dolphin and the harbour porpoise.

The Bay of Fundy mudflats are a rare and unique intertidal habitat. Major mudflats are found on around the Maringouin Peninsula which lies between Shepody Bay and the Cumberland Basin and at the northern end of Chignecto Bay. On the Nova Scotia side, mudflats are found on the southern side of the Minas Basin and in Cobequid Bay. Due to tidal turbulence, the water in these area contains very high amounts of fine sediment, source from tidal erosion of Carboniferous and Triassic sedimentary rock. Primary producers include hollow green weed, phytoplankton, algae, and sea lettuce.

Protected areas include:
 Boot Island National Wildlife Area in the Minas Basin near the mouth of the Gaspereau River.
 Chignecto National Wildlife Area: near Amherst, contains a wide variety of habitats due to its geology.
 Grindstone Island Conservation Easement: managed by the Nature Trust of New Brunswick through a conservation easement on an island at the entrance of Shepody Bay.
 Isle Haute, managed by the Canadian Wildlife Service.
 John Lusby Marsh National Wildlife Area: a large wetland system near Amherst.
 Raven Head Wilderness Area, protects  of undeveloped coast along the bay. It is southwest of Joggins and also a site for fossils. It is also a wildlife habitat for endangered species.
 Shepody National Wildlife Area: a habitat for birds and other wildlife, recognized as an important wetland under the Ramsar Convention, a site of importance by the Western Hemisphere Shorebird Reserve Network, and a bird area by BirdLife International. The dominant bird species is the semipalmated sandpiper.
It was donated to the Nature Trust of New Brunswick by Clover Leaf Seafoods in 2011. It is ecologically important for birds, some not common on the mainland, as well as some very rare plants.
 Tintamarre National Wildlife Area

Human geography and history

History 

The Miꞌkmaq fished in the Bay of Fundy and lived in communities around the bay for centuries before the first Europeans arrived. According to Miꞌkmaq legend, the tide was created when Glooscap wanted to take a bath.

The first European to visit the bay may have been Portuguese explorer João Álvares Fagundes in about 1520, although the bay does not appear on Portuguese maps until 1558. The first European settlement was French, founded at Saint Croix Island in Maine, and then Port Royal, founded by Pierre Dugua and Samuel de Champlain in 1605. Champlain named it Labaye Francoise (The French Bay). Champlain describes finding an old rotted cross in the bay which may have been left by the Portuguese.

The village was the first permanent European settlement north of the Spanish St. Augustine, Florida, and predated by two years the first permanent British settlement in Jamestown, Virginia. About 75 years later, Acadians spread out along the bay, founding Grand-Pré, Beaubassin, Cobequid, and Pisiguit.

There was much military action and many attacks on the settlements around the bay, first as the French and British fought for control of the area, leading to the expulsion of the Acadians, and later by Americans during the American Revolution and the War of 1812.

In the 19th century, the bay was the site of much shipping, and shipbuilders flourished, including James Moran of St. Martins, New Brunswick, Joseph Salter, of Moncton, and William D. Lawrence of Maitland, Nova Scotia. Fundy ports produced the fastest ship in the world, ; the largest wooden ship ever built in Canada, ; and the first female sea captain in the western world, Molly Kool. The mystery ship  was also built there.

The highest water level ever recorded, occurred in October 1869. It caused extensive destruction to ports and communities, much of which was attributed to a two-metre storm surge created by the Saxby Gale, a tropical cyclone, which coincided with a perigean spring tide. Waves breached dykes protecting low-lying farmland in the Minas Basin and the Tantramar Marshes, sending ocean waters surging far inland.

Settlements
The largest population centre on the bay is Saint John, New Brunswick, a major port and the first incorporated city in what is now Canada. Other settlements include, in New Brunswick, St. Andrews, Blacks Harbour, Grand Manan, Campobello, St. Martins, Alma, Riverside-Albert, Hopewell Cape, and Sackville, and in Nova Scotia, Amherst, Advocate Harbour, Parrsboro, Truro, Maitland, Cheverie, Windsor, Wolfville, Canning, Annapolis Royal, and Digby.

Ports and shipping

The port of Saint John gives access to the pulp and paper industry and the Irving oil refinery. Hantsport, Nova Scotia, also has a pulp and paper mill and ships gypsum to the United States.

The bay is also traversed by ferries:
 Saint John to Digby, operated by Bay Ferries.
 Grand Manan to Blacks Harbour and White Head Island, to Grand Manan, operated by Coastal Transport.
 The Letete to Deer Island Ferry, operated by the New Brunswick Department of Transportation.
 Campobello Island, to Deer Island and Eastport, Maine, to Deer Island. Operated by East Coast Ferries Limited.
 Brier Island to Long Island and Long Island to peninsular Nova Scotia, operated by Nova Scotia Department of Transportation and Public Works.

Gallery

References

See also
 Military action in the bay: Raid on St. John (1775), Battle off Cape Split, Raid on Annapolis Royal (1781).
 Fundy National Park, which connects to the Fundy Footpath.
 The Rocks Provincial Park, site of the Hopewell Rocks
 Cape Chignecto Provincial Park: Nova Scotia's largest provincial park, named for Cape Chignecto, a headland which divides the Bay of Fundy and Chignecto Bay to the north and the Minas Channel leading to the Minas Basin to the east.
 Blomidon Provincial Park and Five Islands Provincial Park, both in Nova Scotia.
 Roosevelt Campobello International Park: preserves the house and surrounding landscape of the summer retreat of Franklin D. Roosevelt, on Campobello Island in New Brunswick.

External links

 Where the Bay Becomes the Sea: a documentary about the Bay of Fundy ecosystem
 Bay of Fundy Ecosystem Partnership: scientific and popular information about the Bay.

Bays of New Brunswick
Bays of Nova Scotia
Bays of Maine
Bays of the Atlantic Ocean
Borders of New Brunswick
Borders of Nova Scotia
Canada–United States border